Florissantia can refer to:

 Amyzon (city), an ancient city in what is now Turkey
 Amyzon (fish), an extinct Eocene fish genus from North America

See also
 Amazon (disambiguation)